Richard Ryder (5 July 1766 – 18 September 1832) was a British Tory politician. He notably served as Home Secretary between 1809 and 1812.

Background
Ryder was a younger son of Nathaniel Ryder, 1st Baron Harrowby and his wife Elizabeth, daughter of the Right Reverend Richard Terrick, Bishop of London. Dudley Ryder, 1st Earl of Harrowby, was his elder brother and the Right Reverend the Hon. Henry Ryder, Bishop of Coventry and of Lichfield, his younger brother. He was educated at St John's College, Cambridge.

Political career
Ryder sat as Member of Parliament for Tiverton from 1795 to 1830 and was sworn of the Privy Council in 1807. From 1809 to 1812 he served as Home Secretary under Spencer Perceval.

Family
Ryder married in 1799 Frederica, daughter of Sir John Skynner, from whom Ryder inherited the Great House in Great Milton, Oxfordshire in 1805. There were no surviving children from this marriage. Frederica died in August 1821. Ryder survived her by eleven years and died in September 1832, aged 66.

References

External links 
 

1766 births
1832 deaths
Members of the Privy Council of the United Kingdom
Younger sons of barons
British Secretaries of State
Members of the Parliament of Great Britain for English constituencies
Members of the Parliament of the United Kingdom for English constituencies
UK MPs 1801–1802
UK MPs 1802–1806
UK MPs 1806–1807
UK MPs 1807–1812
UK MPs 1812–1818
UK MPs 1818–1820
UK MPs 1820–1826
UK MPs 1826–1830
Richard
British MPs 1790–1796
British MPs 1796–1800
Alumni of St John's College, Cambridge